Quentin Dean (July 27, 1944 – May 7, 2003) was an American actress of the 1960s.

Born Quintin Corinne Margolin (some sources cite Corinne Ida Margolin), she was introduced as the 16-year-old temptress Delores Purdy in Norman Jewison's 1967 hit film In the Heat of the Night, for which she received a Golden Globe nomination for Best Supporting Actress. Her acting career ended in 1969.

She died of cancer at age 58 in Los Angeles, California.  Her remains were cremated and the ashes scattered at sea in the Pacific Ocean.

The Ballad of Quentin Dean was recorded by Steve Hart and the Cadillac Angels in January 2014.

Filmography

References

External links
 

1944 births
2003 deaths
American film actresses
Actresses from California
Place of birth missing
Deaths from cancer in California
20th-century American actresses
21st-century American women